Hugo Salcedo (born January 25, 1946) is a former soccer player who was a member of the U.S. Olympic soccer team. He coached at the collegiate level at UCLA and has spent over thirty years in various executive positions with FIFA, USSF and Major League Soccer.

Player
Salcedo attended the University of California, Riverside where he played on the men's soccer team from 1967 to 1969.  He holds the school's single season assist record with 14.  He also played for the Compton Soccer Club at the time of the 1972 Summer Olympics.  In 1971, he was part of the U.S. Pan American Games soccer team which finished with a 0-4-1 record.  A year later, he played two games at the 1972 Summer Olympics.  He graduated from UC Riverside with a bachelor's degree and later earned a master's degree in Psychiatric Social Work from the University of Southern California.

Coach
Salcedo spent one season as the head soccer coach at Whittier College.  In 1978, he became an assistant coach at UCLA, a position he held for two seasons. His son Jorge was a player at UCLA who went on to play for Morelia Monarcas in Mexico and for five Major League Soccer clubs before becoming the head coach of the UCLA Bruins men's soccer team in 2004.

Executive
Salcedo has held various positions in USSF, FIFA, and Major League Soccer.  In 1976, he joined the USSF Board of Directors.  In 1982, he became part of the organizing committee developing the soccer tournament for the 1984 Summer Olympics.  Three years later, he joined FIFA where he was a coordinator for Olympic and World Cup sites.  In 1992, he became responsible for the oversight of the administrative portion of FIFA's coaching courses.  Finally, he spent two years working for MLS in moving Hispanic players in to MLS.

Sports agent
In 2005, Salcedo was hired by Proactive Sports Management, the leading agency representing U.S. soccer players.  According to the company, he was hired, "to help the company establish a strong presence in the Latin American market."
 
In 2008, he was awarded the Jerry Yeagley Award for exceptional personal achievement.  Salcedo's son Jorge later played in Major League Soccer and is the head soccer coach of UCLA.

References

1946 births
Living people
Footballers from Guadalajara, Jalisco
Mexican emigrants to the United States
American soccer coaches
American soccer players
Footballers at the 1971 Pan American Games
Pan American Games competitors for the United States
Footballers at the 1972 Summer Olympics
Olympic soccer players of the United States
UCLA Bruins men's soccer coaches
UC Riverside Highlanders men's soccer players
Association football forwards
Mexican footballers